Laura Benét (13 June 1884 – 17 February 1979), was an American social worker, biographer and newspaper editor.

Life and work
Laura Benét was born at Fort Hamilton, Brooklyn, New York, on 13 June 1884. Her brothers both won the Pulitzer Prize, the writer William Rose Benét and the poet Stephen Vincent Benét. She graduated from the Emma Willard School in 1903 and, four years later, from Vassar College with an A.B. degree. Benét was a settlement worker in New York City from 1913 to 1916 and then became an inspector for the Red Cross Sanitary Commission during World War I. After the war, she returned home in 1919 to help care for her brother William's three children after the death of his first wife, Teresa Thompson (sister of the novelist Kathleen Thompson  Norris),  during the flu pandemic. Benét occasionally wrote for the Literary Review and then began writing biographies for children and adults while working as a newspaper editor for the New York Sun and the New York Times. She mostly wrote literary biographies, including ones on both of her brothers, and also compiled biographies like Famous English and American Essayists. She wrote her memoir, When William Rose, Stephen Vincent, and I Were Young, in 1976. Benét died in New York on 17 February 1979. She is buried at Arlington National Cemetery with her parents, U.S. Army Colonel James Walker Benét (1857-1928) and Frances Neill Rose Benét (1860-1940).

Selected works
 Fairy Bread, 1921
 Noah's Dove, 1929
 Goods And Chattels, 1930
 Basket for a Fair, 1934
 The Boy Shelley, 1937
 Caleb's Luck, 1938
 The Hidden Valley, 1938
 Enchanting Jenny Lind, 1939
 Roxana Rampant, 1940
 Young Edgar Allan Poe, 1941
 Come Slowly, Eden, 1942
 Washington Irving: Explorer of American Legend, 1944
 Is Morning Sure?, 1947
 Thackeray of the Great Heart and Humorous Pen, 1947
 Barnum's First Circus and Other Stories, 1949
 Famous American Poets, 1950
 Coleridge: Poet of Wild Enchantment, 1952
 Stanley: Invincible Explorer, 1955
 In Love With Time: Poems, 1959
 Famous American Humorists, 1959
 Famous Poets for Young People, 1964
 Horseshoe Nails, 1965
 Famous English and American Essayists, 1966
 Famous Biographies for Young People, 1966
 Washington Irving: Explorer Of American Legend, 1966
 Famous New England Authors, 1970
 The Mystery of Emily Dickinson, 1973
 Bridge of a Single Hair: A Book of Poems, 1974
 When William Rose, Stephen Vincent, and I Were Young, 1976

Notes

References

1884 births
1979 deaths
Vassar College alumni
20th-century American biographers
American women biographers
20th-century American women writers
Emma Willard School alumni